The GeForce 40 series is a family of graphics processing units developed by Nvidia, succeeding the GeForce 30 series. The series was announced on September 20, 2022, at the GPU Technology Conference (GTC) 2022 event; the RTX 4090 was released on October 12, 2022, the 16 GB RTX 4080 was released on November 16, 2022, and the RTX 4070 Ti—originally announced as the 12 GB RTX 4080 —was released on January 5, 2023, with a number of mobile GPUs to follow in February 2023. The cards are based on the Ada Lovelace architecture and feature hardware-accelerated raytracing (RTX) with Nvidia's third-generation RT cores and fourth-generation Tensor Cores.

Details 
Architectural highlights of the Ada Lovelace architecture include the following:

 CUDA Compute Capability 8.9
 TSMC 4Nprocess (custom designed for Nvidia) – not to be confused with N4
 Fourth-generation Tensor Cores with FP8, FP16, bfloat16, TensorFloat-32 (TF32) and sparsity acceleration
 Third-generation Ray Tracing Cores, along with concurrent ray tracing, shading and compute
 Shader Execution Reordering - needs to be enabled by the developer
 Dual NVENC with 8K 10-bit 60FPS AV1 fixed function hardware encoding
 A new generation of Optical Flow Accelerator to aid DLSS 3.0 intermediate AI-based frame generation
 No NVLink support
 DisplayPort 1.4a and HDMI 2.1 display connections
 Double-precision (FP64) performance of the Ada Lovelace chips are 1/64 of single-precision (FP32) performance.

Products

Desktop 
 All the cards feature Micron GDDR6X video memory.

Mobile 
 All models feature GDDR6 memory.

Controversies

RTX 4080 12 GB 
When the 12 GB RTX 4080 was announced, numerous outlets, prominent YouTubers, reviewers, and the community criticized Nvidia for calling it an RTX 4080 instead of RTX 4070, given previous Nvidia GPU generations and the large gap in specifications and performance compared to the 16 GB card. The names RTX 4080 12GB and RTX 4080 16GB implied that the only difference between the two products was a difference in VRAM capacity. However, unlike other cases of the same-named product with differing memory configurations that were otherwise very close in performance, the 12GB RTX 4080 uses a completely different chip and configuration: among other differences, the 12 GB 4080, using the AD104 chip, was to feature 27% fewer CUDA cores, along with a cut down 192-bit memory bus, which in prior generations (e.g. GeForce 10, 20, 30 series) had been used for the xx60-class cards. This made the card up to 30% slower than the 16 GB RTX 4080 in raw performance while being priced significantly higher than previous xx70 cards ($900 vs. $500 for the RTX 3070, approximately 80% more expensive).

On October 14, 2022, Nvidia announced that due to the confusion caused by the naming scheme, it would be "unlaunching"—i.e. postponing the launch of—the 12 GB RTX 4080, with the 16 GB RTX 4080's launch remaining unaffected.

On January 3, 2023, Nvidia reintroduced the 4080 12GB as the RTX 4070 Ti during CES 2023 while reducing its price by $100.

12VHPWR connector failures 

Some buyers of the RTX 4090 reported that the 12VHPWR—also known as PCIe Gen 5 or 16-pin—connectors of their RTX 4090 were melting, which sparked several theories to explain it. After investigation, several sources reported that the main cause was the 12VHPWR connector not being fully socketed whilst being put under load that resulted in overheating of the connector's pins, which in turn caused the melting of the plastic housing.

PCI-SIG, the standards organization responsible for the creation of the 12VHPWR connector has decided to make changes to the connector's specifications following the recent failures.

A class-action lawsuit has been filed against Nvidia over melting 12VHPWR cables which the lawsuit states is "a dangerous product that should not have been sold in its current state." The plaintiff who brought the suit claims that Nvidia unjustly enriched itself, violated the product's warranty and engaged in fraud and they are demanding that Nvidia pay damages to affected customers as compensation.

Following its own investigation and testing, Nvidia officially offered a statement on the melting connectors. They determined that the melting connectors are a cause of user error from not inserting the 12VHPWR connector properly, causing partial contact. They have offered an expedited RMA process for any RTX 4090 affected by the melting connectors. PCI-SIG later said in a statement that Nvidia and their partners were still responsible for testing their products to account for user error.

Reception

RTX 4090 
Upon release, the RTX 4090's performance received praise from reviewers with Tom's Hardware saying "it now ranks among the best graphics cards". A review by PC Gamer gave it 83/100, calling it "a hell of an introduction to the sort of extreme performance Ada can deliver when given a long leash". Tom Warren in a review for The Verge said that the RTX 4090 is "a beast of a graphics card that marks a new era for PC gaming". Aside from gaming performance, PCWorlds review highlighted the RTX 4090's benefits for content creators and streamers with its 24GB VRAM and AV1 encoding ability and was positive towards the Founders Edition's quiet operation and cooling ability.

However, it also received criticism for its value proposition given that it begins at $1,599. Analysis by TechSpot found that the RTX 4090's value at 1440p was worse than the RTX 3090 Ti and that the RTX 4090 did not make much sense for 1440p as it was limited by CPU bottlenecks. Power consumption was another point of criticism for the RTX 4090. The RTX 4090 has a TDP of 450W compared to the 350W of its last generation equivalent. However, Jarred Walton of Tom's Hardware noted that the RTX 4090 has the same 450W TDP as the RTX 3090 Ti while delivering much higher performance with that power consumption.

Aftermarket AIB RTX 4090 variants received criticism in particular for their massive cooler sizes with some models being 4 PCIe slots tall. This made it difficult to fit an RTX 4090 into many mainstream PC cases. YouTube reviewer JayzTwoCents showed an Asus ROG Strix RTX 4090 model being comparable in size to an entire PlayStation 5 console. Another comparison showed Nvidia's RTX 4090 Founders Edition next to the Xbox Series X for size. It was theorized that a reason for the massive coolers on some models is that the RTX 4090 was originally designed to have a TDP up to 600W before it was reduced to its official 450W TDP.

RTX 4080 
The RTX 4080 received more mixed reviews when compared to the RTX 4090. TechSpot gave the RTX 4080 score of 80/100. Antony Leather of Forbes found that the RTX 4080 consistently performed better than the RTX 3090 Ti. The GPU's power efficiency was positively received with Digital Trends finding that the GPU had an average power draw of 271W despite its rated 320W TDP.

The RTX 4080's $1199 price received criticism for its dramatic increase from that of the RTX 3080. In his review for RockPaperShotgun, James Archer wrote that the RTX 4080 "produces sizeable gains on the RTX 3080, though they're not exactly proportional to the price rise". In another critique, RockPaperShotgun highlighted that AIB models can significantly exceed the base $1199 Founders Edition price, creating further value considerations. The Asus ROG Strix AIB model they reviewed came in at $1550 which is $50 less than the RTX 4090 Founders Edition. Tom Warren of The Verge recommended waiting to see what AMD could deliver in performance and value with their RDNA 3 GPUs. AMD's direct competitor, the Radeon RX 7900 XTX, comes in at $999 compared to the $1199 price of the RTX 4080.

The RTX 4080 received criticism for reusing the RTX 4090's massive 4-slot coolers which are not required to cool the RTX 4080's 320W TDP. A smaller cooler would have been sufficient. The RTX 3080 and RTX 3080 Ti with their respective 320W and 350W TDPs maintained 2-slot coolers while the 320W RTX 4080 has a 3-slot cooler on the Founders Edition and 4-slots on many AIB models.

It was reported that RTX 4080 sales were weak compared to the RTX 4090, which had sold out during its launch a month earlier. The global cost of living crisis and the RTX 4080's generational pricing increase have been suggested as contributing factors for poor sales numbers.

See also 
 GeForce 10 series
 GeForce 16 series
 GeForce 20 series
 GeForce 30 series
 Nvidia Workstation GPUs (formerly Quadro)
 Nvidia Data Center GPUs (formerly Tesla)
 List of Nvidia graphics processing units
 Radeon RX 7000 series - competing AMD architecture releasing in a similar time-frame

References

External links 
 Official website
 Nvidia GeForce RTX 40 Series announcement
 Nvidia Ada GPU Architecture Whitepaper
 

Computer-related introductions in 2022
4000 series
Graphics processing units
Graphics cards